The 2006 UEFS Futsal Men's Championship was the seventh UEFS futsal championship held in Catalonia, with 10 teams in competition. The matches were played from 28 November to 3 December in Santa Coloma de Farners, Arbúcies and Sant Hilari Sacalm.

Teams

First round

Group 1

Group 2

Group 3

Final round

Quarterfinals

9-10 places (1st)

5-8 places

Semifinals

9-10 places (2nd)

7-8 places

5-6 places

3rd-4th places

Final

Final standings

See also
UEFS Futsal Men's Championship

External links
UEFS website

UEFS Futsal Men's Championship
International futsal competitions hosted by Catalonia
UEFS
Futsal
UEFS